Mittlere Ebrach (also: Mittelebrach) is a river of Bavaria, Germany.

The name translates to Mean or Middle Ebrach, in order to distinguish it from three other rivers called Ebrach nearby: the Reiche Ebrach, the Ebrach (also called Geiselwinder Ebrach, tributary of the Reiche Ebrach, not to be confused with the Attel tributary Ebrach), and the Rauhe Ebrach.

The Mittlere Ebrach flows into the Rauhe Ebrach near Burgebrach.

See also
List of rivers of Bavaria

References

Rivers of Bavaria
Bamberg (district)
Rivers of Germany